The Proceedings of the Physical Society was a journal on the subject of physics, originally associated with the Physical Society of London, England. In 1968, it was replaced by the Journal of Physics.

Journal history 

 1874–1925: Proceedings of the Physical Society of London 
 1926–1948: Proceedings of the Physical Society 
 1949–1957: Proceedings of the Physical Society, Section A 
 1949–1957: Proceedings of the Physical Society, Section B
 1958–1967: Proceedings of the Physical Society

External links
 Electronic access from the Institute of Physics (IoP)

Physics journals
IOP Publishing academic journals
Academic journals associated with learned and professional societies of the United Kingdom
Defunct journals of the United Kingdom